The Democratic Rally of the Comoros (RDC) is a political party in the Comoros led by Mouigni Baraka, Governor of Grande Comore.

History
The party was established in November 2013.

References

External links
Party website 

Political parties in the Comoros
Political parties established in 2013
2013 establishments in the Comoros